Putney railway station serves Putney in the London Borough of Wandsworth, in southwest London straddling Travelcard zone 2 and zone 3.

The station and all trains serving it are operated by South Western Railway.

History
The station opened when the Nine Elms to Richmond line came into service on 27 July 1846 and was rebuilt in 1885-6 when the track was turned to quadruple as today, as far as Barnes.

Services
The typical off-peak service at the station in trains per hour is:

 4 indirectly to London Waterloo, of which
 2 take the Kingston Loop Line via Kingston to return circuitously to Waterloo
 2 take the Hounslow Loop Line via Hounslow to return circuitously to Waterloo
 6 directly to London Waterloo, that is
 4 as the reverse of the above routes, i.e. the shortest route to Waterloo, as stopping services.
 2 termed semi-fast whose intervening stops are Clapham Junction and Vauxhall 
 2 (every service) to Windsor & Eton Riverside, calling at Richmond, Twickenham, Whitton, Feltham and all 6 following stations.

Connections
London Buses route 14, 37, 39, 85, 93, 337, 424 and 430 and night route N74 serve the station.

References

External links

.

Railway stations in the London Borough of Wandsworth
Former London and South Western Railway stations
Railway stations in Great Britain opened in 1846
Railway stations served by South Western Railway
Railway station
DfT Category C1 stations